Kosgi is a municipality in Narayanpet district of Telangana state in India. It has a population of 21,038 (Census 2001). It is a part of Kodangal constituency of the Telangana state's Legislative Assembly. The notable towns nearby Kosgi are Tandur, Kodangal, Mahabubnagar, Pargi and Narayanpet.

Kosgi Mandal 
Kosgi is the headquarters of the Kosgi Municipality, which comprises 24 villages. The administration of this mandal is run from the Mandal revenue office in Kosgi.

The villages which come under Kosgi Mandal are Amlikunta, Balabhadraipalle, Balwanpally, Bhakthimalla, Bhogaram, Bijjaram, Chandravancha, Chennaram, Hanuman pally, Gundmal, Kadampalle, Kosgi, Kothapalle, Malreddipally, Masaipally, Mirzapur, Mudireddipalle, Mungimalla, Mushrifa, Nacharam, Pothireddy Pally, Sampally, Sarjakhanpet, Thogapur and Lodhipur.

Education 

There is at least one state government's school and/or the Zilla Parishad High Schools (ZPHS) in all the villages in Kosgi mandal. Most of these are primary schools. The major educational institutions in Kosgi mandal are:

Schools in Kosgi are ZPHS, ZPHS (boys), ZPHS Girls (Urdu Medium), SriVani Vidya Mandir(EM),Shanthi Nikethan high school (EM), Govt. high school, Veda techno school, Rainbow high school, Krishnaveni Talent School, Panini High School, Govt. Junior college and Prajna junior college.

Apart from these, the major schools in other parts of the mandal are ZPHS schools in Mirjapur, Gundumal, Mushrifa and Sarjkhan Pet. Higher secondary, Intermediate and higher education institutions are situated only in Kosgi town.

NGO support 
Due to financial constraints the government of Telangana state has instituted a policy to actively seek private/NGO adoption of government schools. As part of this, the NGOs like Asha for education and Bhumi are helping to improve the education in Kosgi mandal. The silicon valley chapter of Asha organization is funding one of such project named Balavikas in Kosgi. The ground work is taken up by Bhumi. This project aims to improve infrastructure, and teaching quality in selected educational institutions in Kosgi.'PVRMES' is one of the NGO primarily donated a school building to Govt. Upper Primary School in Pothireddypally (vill) and the school was renamed to "Pullangari Venkat Reddy Memorial upper primary school" in the year of 2004.'PVRMES' then concentrated on delivering basic infrastructure, needs of poor student's in the constituency.

Migration 

The declining economic feasibility of agriculture, and increasing debts of the farmers in Kosgi mandal has forced them to migrate to the metropolitan cities like Hyderabad and especially Mumbai, where they work mostly as laborer in construction work. The government's efforts, to restore the normal situation using projects like Self Help Groups and Food for Work program have been ineffective.

See also 
 Kodangal

References 

Villages in Narayanpet district